A road, railway line, or canal is normally raised onto an embankment made of compacted soil (typically clay or rock-based) to avoid a change in level required by the terrain, the alternatives being either to have an unacceptable change in level or detour to follow a contour. A cutting is used for the same purpose where the land is originally higher than required.

Materials
Embankments are often constructed using material obtained from a cutting. Embankments need to be constructed using non-aerated and waterproofed, compacted (or entirely non-porous) material to provide adequate support to the formation and a long-term level surface with stability. An example material for road embankment building is sand-bentonite mixture often used as a protective to protect underground utility cables and pipelines.

Intersection of embankments
To intersect an embankment without a high flyover, a series of tunnels can consist of a section of high tensile strength viaduct (typically built of brick and/or metal) or pair of facing abutments for a bridge.

Notable embankments  
 Burnley Embankment: The largest canal embankment in Britain.
 Harsimus Stem Embankment: The remains of a railway built by the Pennsylvania Railroad in Jersey City, New Jersey, United States
 Stanley Embankment: A railway, road and cycleway that connects the Island of Anglesey and Holy Island, Wales. It carries the North Wales Coast Line and the A5 road.

See also 

 Causeway
 Cut and fill
 Cut (earthmoving)
 Fill dirt
 Grade (slope)
 Land reclamation
 Levee
 Roadbed
 Track bed
 Retaining wall

References

External links
 Federal Highway Administration Design Manual: Deep Mixing for Embankment and Foundation Support Federal Highway Administration

Works cited 
 Scott, J., Loveridge, F., & O'Brien, A. S. (2007). of climate and vegetation on railway embankments.

Slope landforms
Rail infrastructure
Road infrastructure
Building engineering
Fills (earthworks)